Artuir mac Áedáin or Artúr mac Áedán was son of Áedán mac Gabráin and a prince of Dál Riata between the 6th and 7th centuries. Artuir was probably a war leader fighting Picts at the northern and eastern borders of the kingdom. He and his brother Eochaid Find were killed at the battle of Miathi around 580–596 AD.

History 
Artuir is mentioned in three medieval sources: in Adomnan's Life of St. Columba, written c. 700; in the genealogical section of The History of the Men of Scotland, originally compiled in the seventh century; and his death is also mentioned in the Annals of Tigernach, which date from around 1088.

His name, Artuir, derived from Arthur, is Brittonic, probably related to a Welsh mother. Maithgemma nic, daughter of Aedan, was said to be the niece of a Brittonic king. Aedan also had two grandsons and a great-grandson with Brittonic names.

The Life of St. Columba mentions Artuir in a chapter between Aedan and Columba, where the saint predicts that Aedan's younger son, Eochaid Buide, will succeed instead of Aedan's chosen sons. Columba then predicts the deaths of Artuir, Eochaid Find, and Domangart while fighting their father's battles. Adomnan adds " Artuir and Echoid Find were slain a little while later, in the battle of Miathi mentioned above. Domangart was killed in a rout of battle in England", illustrating the fulfillment of Columba's prophecy. In the previous chapter, Adomnan portrayed Columba praying for Aedan's victory over the Miathi, indicating that the battle occurred before Columba's death in 596–597.

References

External links 
 Adamnan: Life of St. Columba .
 Senchus Fer n-Alban. The History of the Men of Scotland 

7th-century Scottish people
Medieval Gaels
Sub-Roman Britain
Historical figures as candidates of King Arthur